Rabbi Nachum Neriya (23 October 1941) is the rosh yeshiva of Torah Betziyon in Efrat, Israel, which he founded with his son, Yitzchak. He is a former rabbi at Yeshivat Hakotel.

He is the eldest son of Rabbi Moshe-Zvi Neria, a major figure in the religious-Zionist movement in Israel.

Neriya was a candidate for Chief Rabbi of Jerusalem, and was awarded a Jerusalem Prize for his activities in Kiruv (Jewish outreach).

A Torah scroll was dedicated to the yeshiva in his honor in 2013, where many major rabbinic figures from around Israel came to celebrate Neriya's life and work.

References

Israeli rabbis
Religious Zionist rosh yeshivas
1941 births
People from the West Bank
Living people
Jerusalem Prize recipients